The Washington and Lee University School of Law (W&L Law) is the law school of Washington and Lee University, a private liberal arts college in Lexington, Virginia. It is accredited by the  American Bar Association. Facilities are on the historic campus of Washington and Lee University in Sydney Lewis Hall. W&L Law has a total enrollment of approximately 365 students in the Juris Doctor program and a 6-to-1 student to faculty ratio.

History
The Lexington Law School, the precursor to W&L Law, was founded in 1849 by United States federal judge John White Brockenbrough and is the 16th oldest active law school in the United States and the third-oldest in Virginia. The law school was not integrated into Washington and Lee University (then known as Washington College) until after the Civil War when Robert E. Lee was president of the university. In 1866, Lee annexed the school, known at the time as the School of Law and Equity, to the college and appointed Judge Brockenbrough as the first dean. In 1870, after Lee's death, the School of Law and Equity was renamed as the Washington and Lee University School of Law, in line with the college's name change in honor of Lee. Also in 1870, former Virginia Attorney General John Randolph Tucker was appointed to the faculty and later became Dean followed by his son Henry St. George Tucker, Sr.

In 1900, the law school moved into the newly built Tucker Hall in memory of Dean Tucker. Tucker Hall also housed the law school's first law library—the Vincent L. Bradford Law Library. After significant periods of growth, the law school moved into new Tucker Hall after the original building was destroyed in a fire and the law library was rebuilt with a grant from the Carnegie Corporation of New York. In 1920, W&L Law joined the Association of American Law Schools.

The Washington and Lee Law Review began publication in the Autumn of 1939 and is still in regular publication. After World War II, enrollment increased despite a period of low enrollment during the war. In 1950, the School of Law established its chapter of the Order of the Coif, one of only 80 such chapters in the country. The School of Law admitted its first female students in 1972, and opened its current home, Sydney Lewis Hall, in 1977. In 1992, the Lewis F. Powell, Jr. Wing was added to Sydney Lewis Hall and the Wilbur C. Hall Law Library at a dedication ceremony attended by Justice Powell and presided over by Chief Justice William Rehnquist.

In 2008, Dean Rodney Smolla announced the new third-year program, which became compulsory for W&L Law students in 2011 under Interim Dean Mark Grunewald. This new program turned the entire third year into an experiential curriculum which emphasizes practice, professionalism, and service. Nora Demleitner served as dean from 2012 through 2015, the only woman to hold the position, during which time the school completed its $35 million campaign, Honor Our Past, Build Our Future, renovated Lewis Hall, established the Washington, DC portion of W&L's third-year program, and significantly increased the employment and bar passage rates of its graduates. On July 1, 2015, Brant J. Hellwig became Dean of the law school, the 18th dean since 1849. Also in 2015, W&L Law formed an academic and professional partnership with the Future of Privacy Forum, an information privacy think tank in Washington, DC. The Future of Privacy Forum will facilitate professional, research, and curricular development and the Washington, DC portion of W&L's third-year program will move into its offices.

Facilities

Sydney Lewis Hall is the home of the school of law on the historic campus of Washington and Lee in Lexington, Virginia. Lewis Hall was built in 1977 with a $9 million gift from Best Products founder Sydney Lewis and his wife Frances of Virginia. Lewis Hall was designed by Marcellus Wright Cox & Smith Architects in the Mid-century modern style. In addition to lecture halls, classrooms, and offices for faculty and staff, Lewis Hall houses the 150-seat Millhiser Moot Courtroom with the accompanying Robert E. Stroud Judge's Chambers and the Roger D. Groot Jury Room. The Millhiser Moot Courtroom serves as the continuity of operations site for the United States Court of Appeals for the Federal Circuit. Lewis Hall also has a cafeteria for students, staff, and faculty called the Brief Stop, which serves food, snacks, and drinks.

As part of its $35 million campaign completed in 2015, Honor Our Past, Build Our Future, the School of Law renovated and modernized the facilities. The project resulted in more flexible space for student collaboration and study, new homes for four of the school's legal clinics and student organizations, more natural lighting, a new library reading room, a new high-tech trial courtroom, and an improved entry sequence and navigation for the building.

Lewis Hall's cornerstones are the Wilbur C. Hall Law Library and Lewis F. Powell, Jr. Wing. The  Wilbur C. Hall Law Library is a Federal Depository Library for the U.S. Government and includes a separate faculty library, a rare book room, and an audio-visual media center and is open 24-hours a day. The library houses more than 492,000 volumes and is unique in offering each student personally designated work and storage space. The Powell Wing was built in 1992 to house the professional and personal papers and archives of the United States Supreme Court Justice and noted W&L alum as well as other manuscript collections, rare books, and archives of the law school. The Powell Wing includes an expanded main reading room space, in addition to stack area and work space for the papers. The archives are managed by full-time staff and are open to researchers, faculty, and students.

Programs and admissions
W&L Law's full-time Juris Doctor program, one of the smallest in the country, is the primary degree-program at the Law School. The Class of 2021 numbered 131 students with a median LSAT of 163 and a median undergraduate grade point average of 3.50.  International exchange programs are available for Juris Doctor students with Trinity College in Dublin and the University of Copenhagen in Copenhagen.

Rankings and reputation
Washington and Lee University School of Law ranked 35th in the 2023 U.S. News & World Report national ranking of America's law schools. Since the U.S. News rankings of law schools were first released in 1987, W&L Law has had an average ranking of 26th nationally. Brian Leiter ranked W&L Law's endowment-per-student as 14th in the country, at $214,000 per student, when adjusted for cost-of-living. Above the Law ranked W&L Law 22nd nationally in their 2019 Top 50 Law Schools rankings and, in 2017, 4th nationally in their rankings for the top-rated law schools when measuring alumni satisfaction. National Jurist ranked W&L Law 15th in its list of best law schools for standard of living and 18th in its ranking of the best law libraries. The 2013 edition of On Being a Black Lawyer: The Black Student's Guide to Law Schools, ranked W&L Law 25th in its rankings of the best law schools for black law students. In 2013, National Jurist named W&L's law faculty as the 10th most influential in legal education (the only entire faculty on the list) and 18th in 2014 as well as awarding W&L Law's practical training program a B+ grade in its 2014 listing of the best law schools for practical training. National Jurist also ranked W&L Law as the 5th best value private law school in 2016 in the United States. A ranking of scholarly impact published in the University of St. Thomas Law Journal ranked the faculty 30th nationally. A 2015 ranking by Business Insider, listed W&L Law as the 17th best law schools in the United States to make connections and get a job. Washington and Lee's The Law News has been awarded the ABA's award of the finest law school student newspaper four times, including three years in a row, in 1985, 2013, 2014, and 2015. In 2016, National Jurist included W&L Law on its list of one of the twelve best value private law schools in the United States.

Bar exam results
W&L's Virginia bar passage rate on the July 2017 exam was 86.67% (the state average was 76.43%); W&L had the highest combined average passage rate among Virginia schools for the July 2014 and 2015 exams.  W&L's New York bar passage rate on the July 2015 exam was 92.86% (the state average for ABA law school graduates was 79%). Nationally, W&L Class of 2014 graduates had a 90% passage rate on bar exams in all states. W&L Law was ranked as having the 20th best bar passage rate nationally based on Class of 2015 data.

Post-graduation employment
Based on Class of 2015 data, 85% of W&L Law graduates obtained full-time, long term JD-required or preferred jobs within 10 months of graduation. 50% of the 2015 graduates obtained full-time long-term jobs in law firms (including 21% of graduates getting full-time, long term jobs in firms greater than 100 lawyers) and 19% of 2015 graduates obtained clerkships. The large law firms which employed the most W&L Law graduates were Hunton Andrews Kurth, Alston & Bird, McGuireWoods, K&L Gates, and King & Spalding. The School of Law ranked 18th on the 2012 U.S. News ranking of law schools by recruiters from the top national law firms and 19th on the 2015 U.S News ranking of law schools that send the most students to clerk for a United States federal judge (6.9%). The National Law Journal ranked W&L Law 33rd in its 2015 "Go-To Law Schools" list of law schools that send the highest percentage of students to the 250 largest law firms in the United States.

Juris Doctor curriculum
The Juris Doctor curriculum at W&L consists three unique and integrated years of full-time study with a mix of traditional casebook method and practice-oriented courses.

First-year
In the 1L year, students take required foundational courses in contract law, tort law, civil procedure, criminal law, property law, professional responsibility, administrative law, and international law. Additionally, each student is assigned a small section in which one substantive required course also serves as a legal writing course. This small section consists of approximately 20 students. 1Ls are also assigned to an upper-level student from the Burks Scholar Program who teaches legal research and Bluebook methods.

Second-year
In the 2L year, students focus on advanced coursework. W&L requires evidence law and constitutional law in the second-year as well as the completion of an upper-level writing requirement. The writing requirement can be satisfied through a seminar course, through an independent writing project, or a note in one of the law journals. All other courses in the 2L year are electives and commonly include corporate law and tax law as well as many other classes and seminars. Since establishing the practice-based curriculum, W&L incorporated its experiential curricular offerings, such as practicum courses, into the second-year in addition to casebook-oriented electives.

Third-year
The new third-year program, which began in the fall of 2010, replaced further elective advanced coursework based on the casebook method as is the norm in most ABA law schools. Instead, the program is meant to  simulate client experiences. The 3L year requires students to exercise professional judgment, work in teams, solve problems, counsel clients, negotiate solutions, serve as advocates and counselors — the full complement of professional activity that engages practicing lawyers as they apply legal theory and doctrines to the real-world issues of serving clients ethically and honorably within the highest traditions of the profession.

The Fall semester begins with an immersion course. Students are allowed to choose one of two courses for the two-week immersion. Immersion focuses on either litigation and alternative dispute resolution or transactional practice. Each student is then enrolled in practicum courses of their choosing. These courses cover substantive and advanced law but do so through practical methods of drafting paperwork and problem-solving rather than casebook and the socratic method. Students are also required to take a course in the legal profession as well as a law-related service requirement. Finally, each student is required to be involved in one of W&L's legal clinics, externship programs, or transnational programs to gain real-client experience. The program is flexible and allows students the ability to tailor their schedule and, if they wish, to take several traditional casebook method courses.

The Honor System
The Honor System has been run by the student body since 1905 and is derived from Robert E. Lee during his tenure as President of the University. Any student found guilty of an Honor Violation by his or her peers is subject to a single penalty: expulsion. The Honor System is defined and administered solely by students, and there is no higher review. A formal review, occasionally including referendums, is held every three years to refine the tenets of the Honor System. Students continue to support the Honor System and its single penalty overwhelmingly, and alumni regularly point to the Honor System as one of the distinctive marks they carry with them from their W&L experience. W&L Law students enjoy several distinct benefits from the Honor System. These include more freedom in exam taking as well as an informal account system at the Brief Stop cafeteria in Sydney Lewis Hall. These are balanced by the strict penalty of a violation of the Honor System.

Clinics, journals, moot court, and centers

Notable alumniAcademiaRonald J. Bacigal 1967 — Professor of law, University of Richmond School of Law
Charles A. Graves 1872 - Professor at W&L Law and at the University of Virginia School of Law 
Robert Huntley 1950, 1957 - Former Dean of W&L Law, former President of Washington and Lee University, former President, Chairman, and CEO of Best Products
Robert Shepherd 1959, 1961 — Professor emeritus of law, University of Richmond School of LawArts and entertainmentTerry Brooks 1969 —  New York Times bestselling author of fantasy fiction and creator of the Shannara fantasy series 
David Brown 2000 - Former host of the Marketplace radio program, current anchor of the Texas Standard
Gay Elmore - Two time Southern Conference Men's Basketball Player of the YearBusinessSydney Lewis 1940, 1943 - Prominent Virginia businessman, art collector, and founder of Best Products, recipient with his wife, Frances, in 1987, of the National Medal of the Arts 
Gordon P. Robertson - CEO of the Christian Broadcasting NetworkGovernment and politicsSamuel B. Avis - United States Congressman from West Virginia from 1913 to 1915
Robert D. Bailey, Jr. - West Virginia Secretary of State from 1965 to 1969
Newton D. Baker 1894 — Secretary of War under President Woodrow Wilson, Mayor of Cleveland, Ohio, and named partner at BakerHostetler
Franklin Brockson - United States Congressman from Delaware from 1913 to 1915
Clarence J. Brown 1915 - President of Brown Publishing Company and US Congressman from Ohio from 1939 to 1965
Nathan P. Bryan 1895 - US Senator from the State of Florida, Judge on the United States Court of Appeals for the Fifth Circuit
William James Bryan 1899 - US Senator from Florida 
Bruce L. Castor, Jr. 1986 — Attorney General (interim) and Solicitor General of Pennsylvania; District Attorney, Montgomery County, Pennsylvania (2000–2008); Commissioner, Montgomery County, Pennsylvania (2008-2016 ); President Pennsylvania District Attorneys' Association; Presidential Impeachment Counsel 2021 
Edward Cooper - US Congressman from West Virginia from 1915 to 1919
Spencer Cox 2001 - Governor of Utah
William Fadjo Cravens - US Congressman from Arkansas
John J. Davis 1856 - United States Representative from West Virginia 
John W. Davis 1895, 1892 — 1924 Democratic nominee for United States President; Ambassador to Britain; Solicitor General; argued more cases before the Supreme Court than anyone else in the twentieth century; American Bar Association President; first President of the Council on Foreign Relations; and named partner at Davis Polk & Wardwell 
Joe Donnelly 1981- United States Senator from Indiana
John P. Fishwick, Jr., former United States Attorney for the Western District of Virginia. Attorney in private practice in Roanoke, Virginia.
Vance A. Funk, III 1968 - Mayor of Newark, Delaware
John Goode - 3rd Solicitor General of the United States and United States Congressman from Virginia
Bob Goodlatte 1977 - United States Congressman from Virginia and Chair of the United States House Committee on the Judiciary
R. Booth Goodwin 1996 - United States Attorney for the Southern District of West Virginia
Morgan Griffith 1983 - Congressman from Virginia 
Ondray T. Harris - Executive director of the Public Employee Relations Board of the District of Columbia
James Hay 1877 - United States Representative from Virginia and Federal Judge on the United States Court of Claims 
George Washington Hays - Governor of Arkansas from 1913 to 1917
Homer A. Holt 1918, 1923 - Governor of West Virginia from 1937 to 1941
James Murray Hooker 1896 - US Congressman from Virginia
James L. Kemper - 1842, Governor of Virginia, Confederate General Leading Pickett's Charge 
Ruby Laffoon 1890 - Governor of Kentucky  
Edwin Gray Lee 1859 - Brigadier General in the Confederate States of America
Scott Marion Loftin 1899 - US Senator from Florida and president of the American Bar Association 
Mary Beth Long 1998 - Former Assistant Secretary of Defense for International Security Affairs at the United States Department of Defense and former attorney with Williams & Connolly LLP
John Otho Marsh, Jr. 1951 - Secretary of the Army, 1981–1989, United States Congressman 
Henry M. Mathews 1857 - Governor of West Virginia
Robert Murphy Mayo 1859 - United States Representative from Virginia
Thomas Chipman McRae - Governor of Arkansas, United States Representative
Mark Obenshain 1987 - Member of the Senate of Virginia and Republican nominee for Attorney General of Virginia in the 2013 Virginia election
Mark J. Peake 1988 - Member of the Senate of Virginia 
Miles Poindexter 1891 - Senator from the State of Washington  
Lacey E. Putney — Longest serving member of the Virginia House of Delegates in the history of the Virginia General Assembly
Heartsill Ragon - US Congressman from Arkansas and federal judge on the United States District Court for the Western District of Arkansas
Robert W. Ray 1985 - Partner at Fox Rothschild in New York City and former head of the US Office of the Independent Counsel (succeeded Kenneth Starr) 
Alfred E. Reames 1893 — US Senator from Oregon
Tom Sansonetti 1976 - United States Assistant Attorney General for the United States Department of Justice Environment and Natural Resources Division
Abram Penn Staples 1908 - Attorney General of Virginia and justice on the Supreme Court of Virginia
Charles L. Terry, Jr. - Governor of Delaware 1961–1965
Peter G. Strasser - United States Attorney for the Eastern District of Louisiana
Paul S. Trible, Jr. 1971 — Former US Senator from Virginia, president of Christopher Newport University
William M. Tuck 1921 - Governor of Virginia 
Henry St. George Tucker III 1876 - US Congressman from Virginia, Dean of W&L Law, Dean of the George Washington University Law School, and President of the American Bar Association
David Gardiner Tyler 1869 - United States Representative, Son of President John Tyler, Present at Lee's surrender at Appomattox 
Junius Edgar West - 22nd Lieutenant Governor of Virginia
Seward H. Williams 1895 - US Congressman from Ohio
Harry M. Wurzbach 1896 - US Congressman from TexasJudiciaryWilliam T. Brotherton, Jr. - Chief Justice of the Supreme Court of West Virginia from 1989 to 1994
Archibald C. Buchanan 1914 - Justice on the Supreme Court of Virginia
Christian Compton 1950, 1953 - Justice of the Supreme Court of Virginia from 1974 to 2006
Mark Steven Davis 1988 - United States District Court Judge for the Eastern District of Virginia 
John W. Eggleston 1910 - Chief Justice of the Virginia Supreme Court from 1958 to 1969
Herbert B. Gregory 1911 - Justice on the Virginia Supreme Court from 1930 to 1951
Duncan Lawrence Groner 1894 - US Attorney, Federal District Judge for United States District Court for the Eastern District of Virginia, Chief Judge of the United States Court of Appeals for the D.C. Circuit 
Alexander M. Harman, Jr. - Justice on the Supreme Court of Virginia from 1969 to 1979
Jerrauld Jones 1980 - Judge on the Norfolk Circuit Court
Walter DeKalb Kelley Jr. 1977, 1981 - Former federal judge in the Eastern District of Virginia and current partner at Jones Day 
Jackson L. Kiser 1952 - Judge on the United States District Court for the Western District of Virginia
Joseph Rucker Lamar 1878 — Associate Justice of the Supreme Court of the United States of the United States Supreme Court (1911–1916), Justice of the Supreme Court of Georgia (1903-1905)
Harry Jacob Lemley 1910 - Federal Judge on both the United States District Court for the Eastern District of Arkansas and the United States District Court for the Western District of Arkansas
Daniel B. Lucas - Poet and justice on the Supreme Court of West Virginia from 1889 to 1892
John Ashton MacKenzie 1939 - Federal Judge for the United States District Court for the Eastern District of Virginia
Charles W. Mason 1911 - Justice of the Oklahoma Supreme Court 1923 - 1931
Robert E. Payne 1967 - Judge for the United States District Court for the Eastern District of Virginia
Lewis Franklin Powell, Jr. 1929, 1931 — Associate Justice of the United States Supreme Court (1972–1987), President of the American Bar Association, and named partner at Hunton Williams Gay Powell & Gibson
William Ray Price, Jr. 1978 - Longest serving judge and former Chief Justice of the Supreme Court of Missouri 
Daniel K. Sadler - Justice on the New Mexico Supreme Court
Roscoe B. Stephenson, Jr. 1943, 1947 - Justice on the Supreme Court of Virginia
James Clinton Turk 1952 -  Federal judge and Chief Judge (1973 to 1993) on the United States District Court for the Western District of Virginia 
Sol Wachtler - former Chief Judge of the New York Court of Appeals (1985–1993)
Kennon C. Whittle 1914 - Justice on the Supreme Court of Virginia and president of the Virginia Bar Association
H. Emory Widener, Jr. 1953 - Judge for the United States Court of Appeals for the Fourth CircuitPrivate attorneys'
Robert J. Grey, Jr. 1976 - American Bar Association President 2004–2005
Linda A. Klein 1983 - Immediate past president of the American Bar Association, former chair of the ABA House of Delegates, managing partner of the Georgia offices of Baker, Donelson, Bearman, Caldwell & Berkowitz 
Morgan Meyer 1999 - Lawyer for Bracewell & Giuliani in Dallas, Texas, and incoming 2015 Republican member of the Texas House of Representatives
Prescott Prince 1983 — Attorney defending Khalid Sheikh Mohammed
Christopher Wolf 1980 - Partner at Hogan Lovells, widely recognized as one of the leading American practitioners in the field of privacy and data security law, and founder and co-chair of the Future of Privacy Forum

Notable faculty

John White Brockenbrough - Federal Judge, founder, and former Dean of the Washington and Lee University School of Law
Martin P. Burks - Former Dean and justice on the Virginia Supreme Court
David Bruck - Noted capital defense attorney, Supreme Court advocate, and Director of the Virginia Capital Clearinghouse at W&L Law
Judy Clarke - Noted criminal defense attorney for Ted Kaczynski, Zacarias Moussaoui, Susan Smith, Eric Rudolph, Jared Lee Loughner, and Dzhokhar Tsarnaev
John W. Davis 1895, 1892 - 1924 Democratic nominee for U.S. President; United States Solicitor General; and American Bar Association President
Creigh Deeds - Democratic nominee for Governor of Virginia in 2009 and Virginia State Senator
Nora Demleitner - Former Dean of W&L Law and Hofstra University School of Law
John DiPippa 1978 — former Dean of the University of Arkansas at Little Rock School of Law
Charles A. Graves 1872 - Professor at W&L Law and at the University of Virginia School of Law
Roger Groot - Professor of Criminal Law and noted death penalty expert
Homer A. Holt 1918, 1923 - Governor of West Virginia from 1937 to 1941 
Robert Huntley 1950, 1957 - Former Dean of W&L Law, former President of Washington and Lee University, former President, Chairman, and CEO of Best Products
Allan Ides - Professor and Constitutional Law and Civil Procedure expert
Timothy Jost - Professor and expert in health law
Donald W. Lemons - Chief Justice of the Supreme Court of Virginia
Jeffrey P. Minear - Counselor to Chief Justice John G. Roberts, Jr.
Blake Morant - Dean of the George Washington Law School and former Dean of the Wake Forest University School of Law
David F. Partlett - Former Dean of W&L Law and of Emory University School of Law
Leander J. Shaw, Jr. - Chief Justice of the Florida Supreme Court
Rodney A. Smolla - Dean of Widener University-Delaware Law, Former Dean of W&L Law and University of Richmond School of Law, First Amendment scholar, and former president of Furman University
Abram Penn Staples 1908 - Attorney General of Virginia and justice on the Virginia Supreme Court
Waller Redd Staples - Member of the Confederate House of Representatives and justice on the Virginia Supreme Court
Barry Sullivan - Former Dean and currently professor at Loyola University Chicago School of Law
Henry St. George Tucker III 1876 - Former Dean of W&L Law, Dean of the George Washington University Law School, Congressman from Virginia, and former president of the American Bar Association
John Randolph Tucker - Virginia Attorney General, former Dean, and former President of the American Bar Association
William R. Vance 1869 - Professor at Yale Law School, and Dean of W&L Law, George Washington University Law School, and the University of Minnesota Law School
H. Emory Widener, Jr. 1953 - Judge for the United States Court of Appeals for the Fourth Circuit

References

External links
Washington and Lee University School of Law
Wilbur C. Hall Law Library

Law schools in Virginia
Washington and Lee University
Washington and Lee University School of Law
Educational institutions established in 1849
1849 establishments in Virginia